Taft High School is a public four-year high school located in the Norwood Park neighborhood on the northwest side of Chicago, Illinois, United States. Taft serves communities on the far northwest side, specifically Norwood Park, Edison Park, Jefferson Park, Forest Glen and O'Hare. Taft is operated by the Chicago Public Schools district.

Taft's NJROTC unit  won a Distinguished Unit award every year from 2001-2014. 
In the late 1990s--to stanch the loss of students--Chicago Public Schools made significant changes to the school to attract more neighborhood students.  These included an NJROTC unit, a selective-enrollment academic center for 7th and 8th grade students, and an International Baccalaureate Diploma program.  Taft's IB program became authorized in 2001, and since 2014 has been a "wall-to-wall" IB World School.

Athletics
Taft competes in the Chicago Public League (CPL) and is a member of the Illinois High School Association (IHSA). The boys baseball team were Public League champions in 1968, CPS quarter-finalists in 1985, and regional champions in 2009. The girls volleyball team were Public League champions in the 1979–80 season.

In 2018, the boys varsity football team brought home its first Chicago Public League championship since 1972 with a 29–13 win over Eric Solorio Academy High School.

The wrestling team won four consecutive Chicago Public League Championships. (2018,2019,2020,2021)

Notable alumni

 Donna Mills, class of 1958, is an actress whose best known role was as Abby on the television series Knots Landing.
 Howard Moore is the former basketball head coach for the University of Illinois at Chicago (2010–15).
 Jack Suwinski is an outfielder for the Pittsburgh Pirates MLB team.
 Jerry Krause is the former general manager of the Chicago Bulls (1985–2003) whose teams won six NBA championships.
 Jim Grabowski is a former NFL running back.  He was selected in the first round of the 1966 American Football League Draft by the Miami Dolphins and the first round of the 1966 NFL Draft by the Green Bay Packers.  He played in Super Bowl I and Super Bowl II.
 Jim Jacobs is the co-writer of the musical Grease, parts of which were based on his high school experiences at Taft.
 Joseph A. Tunzi is a Chicago-based author, publisher, and producer.
 Ken Henry, U.S. Olympic gold medalist in speed skating, 1952 Oslo. At the 1960 Winter Olympics in Squaw Valley, California, Henry was chosen to light the final torch at the opening ceremony.
 Lynn Morley Martin is a former congresswoman who served as U.S. Secretary of Labor (1991–93).
 Robert Hanssen is a former FBI agent convicted of spying for the Soviet Union.
 Terry Kath was a guitarist and co-founder of the band Chicago.

References

External links
 Official website

Taft
Taft
Taft
1939 establishments in Illinois
Educational institutions established in 1939